Facundo Cordero (born 31 July 1998) is an Argentine rugby union player who plays for the  in the United Rugby Championship. His playing position is wing or fullback. In 2023, he signed with Glasgow Warriors from Exeter Chiefs with immediate effect for the remainder of the 2022/2023 season.He also represented Argentina XV ten times between 2017 and 2019. His performances for the Chiefs saw him named in the Argentina squad for the 2021 internationals. He is the brother of fellow Argentine international Santiago Cordero.

Reference list

External links
itsrugby.co.uk profile

1998 births
Argentine rugby union players
Living people
Exeter Chiefs players
Rugby union wings
Rugby union fullbacks
Jaguares (Super Rugby) players
Dogos XV players
Glasgow Warriors players